Michael K. Locke (October 3, 1952 – June 23, 2014) was an American politician.

From Kingsport, Tennessee, Locke was a veteran and went to Walters State Community College. He owned Hot Dog Hut in Kingsport, Tennessee. He served in the Tennessee House of Representatives briefly, in 2002, as a Republican succeeding Keith Westmoreland who died in office. Locke was killed in a hit and run accident in Colonial Heights, Tennessee.

Notes

1952 births
2014 deaths
People from Kingsport, Tennessee
Military personnel from Tennessee
Businesspeople from Tennessee
Road incident deaths in Tennessee
Republican Party members of the Tennessee House of Representatives
Walters State Community College alumni
20th-century American businesspeople